Elasmopus arafura is a marine species of amphipod in the family, Maeridae, and was first described in 2011 by Lauren E. Hughes and James K. Lowry, from a specimen collected at "The Blow-holes", Point Quobba on an exposed intertidal rock shelf.

It is found along the coastlines of Western Australia.

References

Crustaceans described in 2011
Taxa named by James K. Lowry
Taxa named by Lauren E. Hughes
Amphipoda